Fuad Bayramov (born 20 May 1998) is an Azerbaijani footballer who plays as a defender for Shamakhi in the Azerbaijan Premier League.

Club career
On 29 April 2017, Bayramov made his debut in the Azerbaijan Premier League for Shuvalan match against Zira.

References

External links
 

1998 births
Living people
Association football defenders
Azerbaijani footballers
Azerbaijan Premier League players
Shamakhi FK players